Spider-Girl or Spidergirl may refer to: 

Anya Corazon, a Marvel Comics Latina superhero who originally called herself Araña.
Ashley Barton, a Marvel Comics antihero and granddaughter of Spider-Man Peter Parker and daughter of Clint Barton from the Marvel's Wastelanders universe.
Mayday Parker, a Marvel Comics superhero and daughter of Spider-Man Peter Parker and Mary Jane Watson from the MC2 (Marvel Comics 2) universe.
Petra Parker, an alternate universe superhero who appears in Ultimate Spider-Man, voiced by Olivia Holt.
Spider Girl (Sussa Paka), a DC Comics superhero

See also
Spider-Woman